Sergey Petrovich Klyugin (Russian: Сергей Петрович Клюгин; born 24 March 1974 in Kineshma) is a Russian high jumper. He won the gold medal at the 2000 Summer Olympics with 2.35m, one centimetre behind his personal best jump from 1998. A bronze medal at 1998's European championships was his only other international medal.

Major achievements

References

1974 births
Living people
People from Kineshma
Sportspeople from Ivanovo Oblast
Russian male high jumpers
Olympic male high jumpers
Olympic athletes of Russia
Olympic gold medalists for Russia
Olympic gold medalists in athletics (track and field)
Athletes (track and field) at the 2000 Summer Olympics
Medalists at the 2000 Summer Olympics
Competitors at the 1998 Goodwill Games
Competitors at the 2001 Goodwill Games
World Athletics Championships athletes for Russia
European Athletics Championships medalists
Russian Athletics Championships winners